Moate is a town in County Westmeath, Ireland.

The name An Móta is derived from the term motte-and-bailey, as the Normans built an example of this type of fortification here. The earthwork is still visible behind the buildings on the main street.

The town later became an important marketplace and Quaker village. It has made the town much more wealthy. There are several extant examples of Quaker houses on the main street, which itself is typical of an Irish marketplace.

Location
Moate is on the Cloghatanny River, also known as the Moate Stream, which is a tributary of the River Brosna.

The town is on the R446 road between Kinnegad and Athlone. Before July 2008, this was the N6 road, a national primary route, and Moate was a serious traffic bottleneck. The new M6 motorway bypasses the town.

Amenities 
Moate is a growing town with an amenity and heritage park, a greenway running through the town, golf club, tennis courts, astro turf pitch, a pastoral centre and a community centre. There are also many businesses such as supermarkets, petrol stations, a post office, a bike shop, hairdressers, clothes shops, a sports shop, a pharmacy, coffee shops, restaurants, pubs and a hotel. Many new building ventures have taken place in recent years, including a complex of apartments and shops at the site of the old Convent of Mercy on Station Road.

Culture and heritage
The local Gaelic football club is the Moate All Whites. The club's name and playing kit colours are based on the white religious habits worn by the Carmelite White Friars, a long established Moate institution.

Tuar Ard Arts Centre is a Community lead project which opened its doors in October 2000. The Centre strives to develop an awareness of and provide as broad a range of visual and performing art forms through creative artistic programming incorporating professional / non-professional activities so that the involvement of all age groups can be expanded and enriched through participation in and access to the arts. It holds a 173 tiered seating auditorium.

Dún na Sí Amenity and Heritage Park is a community park located on the outskirts of the town, encompassing ecology, play, heritage, arts and education. The park comprises the Scéal Exhibition in the Comhaltas Teach Cheoil, heritage trail, sensory garden, pet farm, walking trails, native Irish woodland, turlough, playground and tea rooms.

The former gaol, part of the old courthouse, now contains a small museum housing artefacts found in the area dating from the Stone Age through to the modern era.  The main building of the old courthouse has been renovated into a public library.

A 17th Century ruined Quaker Meetinghouse stands in the centre of the town, the Church of St. Patrick serves as the Catholic parish church and the Church of St. Mary is the local Church of Ireland church. A second Catholic Church, the Church of the Immaculate Conception, stands to the north of the town.

Transport

Bus
Bus Éireann and Irish Citylink operate Dublin–Galway bus routes that service Moate.

Rail
The disused Moate railway station was built by the Midland Great Western Railway to connect Dublin and Galway and opened on 1 August 1851. It closed for goods traffic on 2 December 1974, and closed for passenger traffic on 27 January 1987. Parts of the film The First Great Train Robbery (1979) were filmed on the local railway. The crew of about 150 actors, extras, and production team, spent around two weeks in and around Moate filming. The cast of the movie stayed at the Royal Hoey Hotel during this time. The train station depicted as "Ashford" is actually Moate Station.

Dublin to Galway Cycleway
The Mullingar (West) to Garrycastle (Athlone East) section of the Dublin-Galway Greenway (cycleway) was opened on 3 October 2015 by the Taoiseach Enda Kenny in Moate.  The cycleway links Moate to Athlone and Mullingar on a 3m wide 40 km long cycleway.

Climate

Education
Moate has two primary schools: St. Brigid's Primary School on Station Road, formerly known as Convent Primary School, is co-educational and was founded by the Sisters of Mercy in 1861. The other is St. Oliver Plunkett Boys' Primary School on Lake Road.

The town's secondary school is Moate Community School on Church Street. A new building opened in the school in 2002 containing a gymnasium, four new science laboratories, a home economics room, art room, lecture hall, technical drawing classroom and an oratory as well as general classrooms and offices. It has approximately 1,250 students (including Moate Business College) and a staff of 130. The business college provides courses including performance arts and information technology.

Patrick Kelly Memorial Park
A memorial park opened in December 2008, named after the only Irish soldier to die in combat in Ireland since the end of the Irish Civil War.  On 16 December 1983, Patrick Kelly, who was from Moate, was attempting to free American businessman Don Tidey, who had been kidnapped by the Irish Republican Army. Along with Garda recruit Gary Sheehan, he was killed in a shoot-out with IRA gunmen at Derrada Woods in Ballinamore, County Leitrim.

Notable people

 Abraham Boulger, Victoria Cross recipient
 T.R. Dallas, singer
Patrick Kelly, soldier
 Ray Lynam, country singer
 Colm Murray, sports broadcaster
Lorcan Robbins, (1884/85–1939), activist and politician
Nessa Robins, food writer
 Joe Ward, boxer
 William Duckett White (1807–1893), politician and member of the Queensland Legislative Council

References

External links

Towns and villages in County Westmeath